The 2015 Saint Francis Red Flash football team represented Saint Francis University in the 2015 NCAA Division I FCS football season. They were led by sixth year head coach Chris Villarrial and played their home games at DeGol Field. They were a member of the Northeast Conference. They finished the season 6–4, 4–2 in NEC play to finish in second place.

Schedule

± College of Faith didn't meet NCAA accreditation guidelines and all stats and records from this game do not count

References

Saint Francis
Saint Francis Red Flash football seasons
Saint Francis Red Flash football